Snow skin moon, snowy mooncake, ice skin mooncake or crystal mooncake is a Chinese food eaten during the Mid-Autumn Festival. Snow skin mooncakes are a non-baked mooncake originating from Hong Kong.

The snow skin mooncake is also found in Macau, Mainland China, Taiwan, Singapore, Malaysia and Indonesia.
Although snow skin mooncakes are usually made and sold by bakeries, these mooncakes are not baked in ovens like traditional cakes. Further, unlike traditional mooncakes which are served at room temperature, snow skin mooncakes are typically eaten cold.

History
The snow skin mooncake emerged in the 1960s.
It was developed by a bakery in Hong Kong, because the traditional Cantonese mooncakes were made with salted duck egg yolks and lotus seed paste, resulting in very high sugar and oil content. Since many customers thought traditional mooncakes were an oily food, the bakery used fruit for filling and less oil to make a mooncake with less fat.
Another early pioneer of snow skin mooncakes is Poh Guan Cake House in Singapore.

Snow skin mooncakes gradually become popular in the 1970s. At that time the snow skin mooncake was also called a "crystal mooncake". The name "Bing Pi Yue Bing" appeared in advertisements in the early 1980s.

Composition
The crust of snow skin mooncake is made of glutinous rice, which is frozen.
The snow skin mooncake is similar to mochi ice cream or yukimi daifuku, as both have glutinous rice crusts and have to be kept frozen. 

Snow skin mooncakes are typically white and are served cold, which is why they are named "snow skin". However, mooncakes may have other colors because of added flavors in their crusts. For example, if chocolate is added, the color of the crust might be brown. Green-colored skin is made with the juice of the aromatic Pandan (Pandanus amaryllifolius) leaf, a popular and uniquely South-East Asian flavor.

While traditional mooncakes are usually filled with salted duck egg yolks and lotus seed paste or red bean paste, snow skin mooncakes can be filled with a variety of fillings such as mung bean paste, fruit, green tea, jam, strawberry, chocolate, coffee, cheese. Other flavored fillings include durian, sesame, mango pomelo sago, and purple yam.

Production and storage
The requirements of production, storage and transportation for snow skin mooncakes are more stringent than for baked mooncakes. Because snow skin mooncakes are not baked in an oven, high temperatures cannot be used to kill bacteria. Factories have to keep sterile conditions, and many manufacturers are requested to follow HACCP systematic for food safety. The mooncakes are also kept at a low temperature while in storage, shipping and at the retailer to prevent bacteria growing. Snow skin mooncakes were difficult to find in Mainland China before the 2000s, because of the need to keep them refrigerated while in transit from the producer to the consumer.

Snow skin mooncakes are usually packaged in plastic bags in pairs or individually. Because they are not baked, snow skin mooncakes must be refrigerated and can be stored in freezer for up to a few weeks. They are typically thawed for a few hours in a refrigerator before serving, to allow them to soften. Thawed mooncakes should be consumed within 2 hours.  Refreezing is not advised.

See also

 Mochi ice cream
 Yukimi Daifuku
 List of Chinese desserts
 List of desserts

References

External links 
 

Autumn traditions
Chinese desserts
Glutinous rice dishes
Hong Kong cuisine
Macau cuisine
Cantonese cuisine